Crispy Pancakes may refer to:

 Khanom buang, a Thai dish often sold by street vendors, called "crispy pancakes" in English
 Crispy Pancakes (brand), the brand name of a product from the Findus company